Kim Hyok-son (born 1 June 1989) is a North Korean footballer. He represented North Korea on at least three occasions in 2016.

Career statistics

International

References

1989 births
Living people
Sportspeople from Pyongyang
North Korean footballers
North Korea international footballers
Association football midfielders
Rimyongsu Sports Club players
Kyonggongopsong Sports Club players